Middlebush Brook is a tributary of Six Mile Run in Somerset County, New Jersey in the United States.

As its name suggests, Middlebush Brook begins in the town of Middlebush.

Tributaries
This stream has several unnamed tributaries. One closely parallels South Middlebush Road before splitting into two more tributaries. One of them ends in a development near Amwell Road (the same road as Hamilton Street), while the other is a drain for a residential development.

Course
It exits the commerce area and flows through a marsh, then crossing Bennetts Lane. It runs behind a cow farm then crosses South Middlebush Road right above Blackwells Mills Road.

It has several branches, including one that runs for a distance along South Middlebush Road and one that flows to a residential development near CR-514 (Amwell Road).

Accessibility
This stream flows through wooded areas downstream, where it is not accessible easily. It is accessible upstream though, where it flows through a residential development.

It may be accessed, though with difficulty, at the Blackwells Mills Road crossing.

Terrain
This stream has a streambed composed of small boulders, making it difficult to walk on. Some locations have pebbles. It is not muddy and therefore is not suitable for frogs.

Sister tributaries
Cross Brook
Steep Hill Brook
Nine Mile Run

Gallery

See also
List of rivers of New Jersey

References

External links
USGS Coordinates in Google Maps

Tributaries of the Raritan River
Rivers of New Jersey
Rivers of Somerset County, New Jersey